The United States Refugee Act of 1980 (Public Law 96-212) is an amendment to the earlier Immigration and Nationality Act of 1965 and the Migration and Refugee Assistance Act of 1962, and was created to provide a permanent and systematic procedure for the admission to the United States of refugees of special humanitarian concern to the U.S., and to provide comprehensive and uniform provisions for the effective resettlement and absorption of those refugees who are admitted.The act was completed on March 3, 1980, was signed by President Jimmy Carter on March 17, 1980, and became effective on April 1, 1980. This was the first comprehensive amendment of U.S. general immigration laws designed to face up to the realities of modern refugee situations by stating a clear-cut national policy and providing a flexible mechanism to meet the rapidly shifting developments of today's world policy. The main objectives of the act were to create a new definition of refugee based on the one created at the UN Convention and Protocol on the Status of Refugees, raise the limitation from 17,400 to 50,000 refugees admitted each fiscal year, provide emergency procedures for when that number exceeds 50,000, requiring annual consultation between Congress and the President on refugee admissions, and to establish the Office of U.S. Coordinator for Refugee Affairs and the Office of Refugee Resettlement. Most importantly, it established explicit procedures on how to deal with refugees in the U.S. by creating a uniform and effective resettlement and absorption policy.

Purpose
The Act recognizes that it has been the historic policy of the United States to respond to the urgent needs of persons subject to persecution in their homelands and to provide assistance, asylum, and resettlement opportunities to admitted refugees. The goal of the Refugee Act was to create a uniform procedure with which to provide these opportunities to refugees.

Admission of Refugees
The Act amended the Immigration and Nationality Act of 1965 by defining a refugee as any person who is outside his or her country of residence or nationality, or without nationality, and is unable or unwilling to return to, and is unable or unwilling to avail himself or herself of the protection of, that country because of persecution or a well-founded fear of persecution on account of race, religion, nationality, membership in a particular social group, or political opinion.

The annual admission of refugees is set to a 50,000 cap per fiscal year, but in an emergency situation, the President may change the number for a period of twelve months. The Attorney General is also granted power to admit additional refugees and grant asylum to current aliens, but all admissions must be reported to Congress and be limited to 5,000 people.

Summary
The Act created the position of U.S. Coordinator for Refugee Affairs who was now responsible to the president for the development of overall US refugee admission and resettlement policy.

Title IV of the Immigration and Nationality Act was amended here when the Act created the Office of Refugee Resettlement, which is responsible for funding and administering federal programs for domestic resettlement and assistance to refugees. The office must make available resources for employment training and placement for refugees to be economically self-sufficient, provide opportunities for English language training, ensure cash assistance, and guarantee gender equality in all training and instruction. The Office must also create grants for these projects, consult with state and local governments about sponsorship and distribution of refugees, and develop a system to monitor the use of government funds using evaluations, auditing and data collection. To receive assistance for programs, the States must first explain how they plan to accomplish the goals of these programs, meet the director's standards, and submit a report at the end of each fiscal year.

The Secretary of State was authorized to take on the role from 1980 to 1981, and the new director worked with them to develop and implement programs for existing refugees and eventually took up the position from 1982 onward. The director must submit a congressional report at the end of each fiscal year to committees on the Judiciary of the United States House of Representatives and the United States Senate. The reports should contain information on the geographic location, employment status, and problems of the refugees and also contain suggestions for alternative resettlement strategies. The Office was authorized $200,000,000 during 1980 and 1981, and that number is now decided at the beginning of each fiscal year based on the results received at the end of each year.

History
It was only after World War II that the United States began to differentiate the term "refugee" from "immigrant" and began creating policy that dealt specifically with refugees while working outside of immigration policy. Early action came in the form of the Displaced Persons Act of 1948, the Refugee Relief Act of 1953, and the Refugee-Escapee Act of 1957. The Immigration and Nationality Act of 1952, which was later amended in 1965 to include policy for refugees on a case-by-case basis, was the first Act that consolidated U.S. immigration policy into one body of text.

The creation of the Refugee Act began with hearings by the United States Senate Judiciary Subcommittee on Immigration, Refugees and Border Security from 1965 to 1968, which recommended for Congress create a uniform system for refugees, but received little support. Edward Kennedy began writing to propose a bill to reform refugee policy in 1978 and first introduced the idea to the United States Senate in 1979. With his proposal, he hoped to address the need for a reformed policy that was not specifically designed for people from communist regimes in Eastern Europe or repressive governments in the Middle East, as it was in the past. At the time, there was an average of 200,000 refugees coming to the United States, most of which were Indochinese and Soviet Jews. The cost of resettlement was close to $4000, but most refugees eventually paid that amount in federal income taxes.

Many Americans feared a floodgate scenario with a large and sudden increase of the refugee population, but the 50,000 cap would account for only 10% of immigration flow to the U.S. and would allow one refugee for every 4000 Americans, small numbers compared to those of countries like Canada, France, and Australia. The bill was adopted by the Senate by a unanimous vote on September 6, 1979, and it remained essentially intact until it was signed in 1980. However, not long after, the United States was hit with an influx of Cuban refugees as a result of the Cuban crisis, about 115,000 Cuban refugees arrived in Florida. This caused the administration to temporarily pause the use of the act. On April 14th, 1980, President Carter signed an executive order for the emergency provisions of the Refugee Act to respond to an appeal on behalf of 12,000 Cubans in Havana. The United States welcomed 3,500 Cubans after partaking in international resettlement efforts. Eventually the Cuban refugee influx was significantly Controlled to the point where the United States was able to return to the practice of the Refugee Act.

Notes

References

Anker, Deborah E. & Posner, M. H. (1981). The Forty Year Crisis: A Legislative History of the Refugee Act of 1980. The San Diego Law Review, 9-89.
Kennedy, E. M. (1981). Refugee Act of 1980. Refugees Today, 141–156.
Refugee Act of 1980. Pub. L. 96-212. 94 Stat. 102. 17 March 1980. Print.
Roberts, M. A. (1982). The U.S. and Refugees: The Refugee Act of 1980. A Journal of Opinion: African Refugees and Human Rights, 4–6.

External links
 US Dept. of Health and Human Services page about the Refugee Act

1980 in American law
United States federal immigration and nationality legislation
96th United States Congress
Right of asylum legislation
Right of asylum in the United States